Paulo Ezequiel Londra (born 12 April 1998) is an Argentine rapper and singer. His music has topped Argentine charts and been highly successful across Argentina and Latin America.

Early life 

Londra was inspired to become a rap artist by watching Eminem's 8 Mile film. The urge to interpret his lyrics outside of a recording studio led him to improvise and rap in Argentinian squares with friends, gradually creating a local buzz. Leaving his comfort zone and freestyling in squares helped with his shyness, and launched a competitive period spanning around five years. He forged his style battling in freestyle contests as the so-called El Quinto Escalón, and rapidly stepped up to Latin trap.

Career 
His professional career kicked off with "Relax", a song he uploaded in early 2017. Londra's music avoids themes prominent in urban music, such as violence and drugs.

Londra became well known through his hit songs "Nena Maldición" (featuring Lenny Tavarez), "Te Amo" (with Piso 21), and "Cuando Te Besé" (with Becky G). The latter peaked at number 45 on the Billboard Hot Latin Songs and became the first song to ever top the Billboard Argentina Hot 100. His song "Adán y Eva" also topped Billboard's Argentina Hot 100.

In 2019, he was featured on Ed Sheeran's No.6 Collaborations Project, performing on the song "Nothing on You" along with British rapper Dave. On 26 September of the same year, Londra released the song "Party", a collaboration with the American rapper and singer A Boogie wit da Hoodie. In May 2020, a conflict between Paulo and his label Big Ligas was made public through Instagram, where Ovy on the Drums and Kristoman were accused of manipulating Londra's contract and defrauding him to have the rights to his songs without the consent of the latter. Londra would later publish an open letter in which he would disclose the reasons for the conflict, claiming that they made him sign with Warner Music without his consent to record his first album, and that they scammed him into signing a contract that linked him to Big Ligas until 2025. This resulted in Paulo not being able to release more music until he could solve the court case that his lawyers are carrying out to be able to terminate his contract with Warner and Big Ligas.

Discography

 Homerun (2019)
 Back to the Game (2022)

Tours
Leones Con Flow Tour (2018)
Homerun Tour (2019–2020)

Awards and nominations

References

1998 births
Living people
Argentine rappers
Hispanic and Latino American rappers
Argentine trap musicians
Latin trap musicians
Warner Records artists
21st-century Argentine singers
Warner Music Latina artists